The province of Central Papua (Provinsi Papua Tengah) in Indonesia is divided into eight kabupaten (regencies) which in turn are divided administratively into districts, known as distrik under the law of 2001 on "special autonomy for Papua province".

List
The districts of Central Papua and their respective regencies are as follows (as of July 2022). Administrative villages (desa in rural areas and kabupaten in urban areas) are also listed for each district.

See also
List of districts of West Papua
List of districts of South Papua

References

 
Central Papua